Thuridilla  is a genus of sacoglossan sea slugs, shell-less marine opisthobranch gastropod mollusks in the family Plakobranchidae.

Species 
There are 24 species within the genus Thuridilla:
 Thuridilla albopustulosa Gosliner, 1995
 Thuridilla bayeri (Er. Marcus, 1965)
 Thuridilla carlsoni Gosliner, 1995
 Thuridilla coerulea (Kelaart, 1857)
 Thuridilla decorata (Heller & Thompson, 1983)
 Thuridilla flavomaculata Gosliner, 1995
 Thuridilla gracilis (Risbec, 1928)
 Thuridilla haingsisiana (Bergh, 1905)
 Thuridilla hoffae Gosliner, 1995
 Thuridilla hopei (Vérany, 1853)
 Thuridilla indopacifica Gosliner, 1995
 Thuridilla kathae Gosliner, 1995
 Thuridilla lineolata (Bergh, 1905)
 Thuridilla livida (Baba, 1955)
 Thuridilla malaquita Ortea & Buske, 2014
 Thuridilla mazda Ortea & Espinosa, 2000
 Thuridilla moebii (Bergh, 1888)
 Thuridilla multimarginata Gosliner, 1995
 Thuridilla neona Gosliner, 1995
 Thuridilla picta (A. E. Verrill, 1901)
 Thuridilla ratna (Er. Marcus, 1965)
 Thuridilla splendens (Baba, 1949)
 Thuridilla undula Gosliner, 1995
 Thuridilla vataae (Risbec, 1928)
 Thuridilla virgata (Bergh, 1888)
Synonyms
 Thuridilla thysanopoda (Bergh, 1905): synonym of Elysia thysanopoda Bergh, 1905

Gallery

References

External links
 Bergh, L. S. R. (1872). Malacologische Untersuchungen. In: C. Semper (ed.) Reisen im Archipel der Philippinen, Wissenschaftliche Resultate. Theil 1, Heft 3: 137-176, pls 17-20

Plakobranchidae
Gastropod genera